Darya Viktorovna Shmelyova (born 28 May 1976) is a retired Russian swimmer who won silver medals in the 200 m and 400 m medley at the 1993 European Aquatics Championships. She competed in the same events at the 1996 Summer Olympics and 1991 and 1995 European championships, but finished outside the medals. 

In early 1997 she married the Russian swimmer Alexander Popov, and since then lived with him for years in Australia, Switzerland and Russia. They have two sons, Vladimir (b. 1997) and Anton (b. 2000), and a daughter, Mia (b. 22 December 2010).

References

1976 births
Living people
Swimmers at the 1996 Summer Olympics
Russian female swimmers
Olympic swimmers of Russia
European Aquatics Championships medalists in swimming